Première Compagnie is French television reality presented by Laurence Boccolini (weekly) and Bruno Roblès (daily) and broadcast on TF1 from 5 February 2005 to 25 March 2005. The show was produced by Endemol.

Contestant

French reality television series